SHI International Corp. (commonly referred to as SHI), headquartered in Somerset, New Jersey, is a privately owned provider of IT infrastructure, end-user computing, cybersecurity, and IT optimization products and services. SHI has customers in the non-profit, private, and public sectors. SHI has been counted among North America's top 15 largest providers of IT solutions. It has 6,000 employees across more than 35 offices in the United States, Canada, France, Hong Kong, Singapore, and the United Kingdom. SHI has amassed 15,000 customers, including companies such as Boeing, Johnson & Johnson and AT&T.

SHI operates two integration centers in Piscataway, New Jersey (Knox – 305,000-sq. ft. and Ridge – 400,000-sq. ft.), along with three international integration centers (Nexus in the U.K., Tiel in the Netherlands, and Tampines in Singapore).

History 

SHI was founded on November 1989 by Thai Lee and Leo KoGuan (co-founder and chairman of the board).

In 2016, SHI acquired Eastridge, a Microsoft services provider.

In Q1 of 2017, SHI launched AWS Support Services for public cloud and forecasts, managing over $1 billion in customers’ Microsoft cloud assets in 2017.

In 2017, SHI acquired  Solutions, Inc. (ESI), the maker of the cloud-based Technology Asset Management (TAM) platform.

In 2018, SHI received the Intel Technology PC Client Solution Partner of the Year award for its Zero Touch offering.

In 2018, Sonde Health Inc., an affiliate of PureTech Health appointed SHI's president and CEO, Thai Lee, to its board of directors.

In 2019, SHI signed a seven-year naming rights partnership with Rutgers University's football stadium in Piscataway, New Jersey (now known as SHI Stadium).

In 2020, SHI's Austin, Texas, office moved into Garza Ranch to keep pace with the company's growth.

In 2020, SHI launched Stratascale, a new subsidiary focused on delivering digital agility and technology consulting.

In July 2022, SHI was shut down for a week due to a cyber attack.

In 2022, SHI Healthcare launched to support America's healthcare providers with their technology needs.

Operations

Public contracts since 2015 
In November 2018, SHI won a spot on a 10-year, $3.17 billion blanket purchase agreement from the U.S. Navy to provide worldwide perpetual licenses and annual subscriptions for Microsoft-made software products to the Defense Department, intelligence community, and U.S. Coast Guard.

In October 2017, SHI achieved Managed Service Provider Partner status from Amazon Web Services.

In April 2017, SHI was awarded the NASPO ValuePoint—Cloud Solutions master agreement, which allows the company to offer Software as a Service (SaaS), Infrastructure as a Service (IaaS), Platform as a Service (PaaS), and value-added services to state and local public sector organizations across potentially every state in the US.

In February 2017, SHI was named to a $13.7 million contract option to support the Defense Logistics Agency’s Microsoft software.

In 2015, SHI was named to two NASA Solutions for Enterprise-Wide Procurement (SEWP) V federal buying contracts for groups A and D.

Ownership 
SHI is owned by billionaire co-founders and former spouses Thai Lee and Leo KoGuan. Lee is the CEO and president of the company and KoGuan is the non-executive chairman; he is also Tesla, Inc.'s third largest private shareholder after Elon Musk and Larry Ellison.

SHI was the largest Minority and Woman Owned Business Enterprise (MWBE) in the U.S. In 2020, it was recognized by Forbes’ list of America's Best Employers for Women.

References 

American companies established in 1989
Information technology companies of the United States
Companies based in Somerset County, New Jersey